Lindsey Collen (born 1948 Mqanduli, Umtata, Transkei, South Africa) is a Mauritian novelist, and activist.
She won the 1994 and 2005 Commonwealth Writers' Prize, Best Book, Africa.

Her work has appeared in the New Internationalist.
She is a member of Lalit de Klas.

She married Ram Seegobin. 
She lives in Mauritius.

Works
There is a tide, Ledikasyon pu Travayer, Port Louis, Mauritius, 1990

Getting rid of it,  Granta Books, London, 1997, .
Mutiny,  Bloomsbury, London, 2001, .
Boy, Bloomsbury, London, 2004, .
The malaria man & her neighbours, Ledikasyon pu Travayer, Port Louis, Mauritius 2010, .

Chapbooks
Komye fwa mo finn trap enn pikan ursen, Ledikasyon pu travayer, 1997, .
Natir imin: Mauritian Creole & English versions, Ledikasyon pu travayer, 2000, .

Anthologies

References

External links
 (Review)
"The Rape of Sita by Lindsey Collen", litbrit, December 18, 2007 (Review)
Lindsey Collen: “Emancipation is the freeing from patriarchy”, defimedia, Noor Adam Essack, 03/4/2011 (interview)

“Lindsey Collen in Conversation”, Literature & Politics, University of Reunion
"The Subversion of Class and Gender Roles in the Novels of Lindsey Collen (1948- ), Mauritian Social Activist and Writer"

1948 births
Living people
People from King Sabata Dalindyebo Local Municipality
South African women novelists
Mauritian activists
South African women activists
Mauritian women novelists
Mauritian novelists
South African emigrants to Mauritius
20th-century South African women writers
21st-century South African women writers
20th-century South African novelists
21st-century South African novelists
White South African people